Cadolive is a commune situated east of Marseille at the eastern extremity of the Massif de l'Étoile between Peypin and Saint-Savournin in the department of Bouches-du-Rhône in the Provence-Alpes-Côte d'Azur region in southern France. Until 1900, it was part of the commune of Saint-Savournin.

Population

See also
Communes of the Bouches-du-Rhône department

References

Communes of Bouches-du-Rhône
Bouches-du-Rhône communes articles needing translation from French Wikipedia